Burton Wanderers Football Club was a football club based in Burton upon Trent, Staffordshire, England. The club were members of the Football League for three seasons in the mid 1890s. In 1901 they merged with Burton Swifts to form Burton United. The club played at Derby Turn.

History
Founded in 1871, the club was amongst the founder members of the Midland League in 1890.  In the 1893–94 season, they finished as champions despite a points deduction for fielding an ineligible player, and were elected to the Second Division of the Football League. However, the club did not last long in the League, and at the end of the 1896–97 season, after finishing second last in the League, they were voted out. In their time in the Second Division, Burton Wanderers beat Newcastle United 9–0, which remains Newcastle's worst league defeat.

The club then rejoined the Midland League, and, after finishing in bottom place in 1901, merged with neighbouring Burton Swifts (who were still members of the Football League) to form Burton United. The new club took Swifts' place in the League and played their home games at the Swifts' Peel Croft ground.

Ground
During their existence Burton Wanderers played their home games at Derby Turn and their record attendance was 6,000 for an FA Cup second round match against Notts County on 10 February 1894.

Honours
Midland League
Champions 1893–94
Runners-up 1892–93

Records
FA Cup
Best season: Second round, 1893–94

References

External links

Burton Wanderers Historical Kits

Defunct football clubs in England
Defunct English Football League clubs
Association football clubs established in 1871
Association football clubs disestablished in 1901
Midland Football League (1889)
Defunct football clubs in Staffordshire
Sport in Burton upon Trent
1871 establishments in England
1901 disestablishments in England